Ira Allen Eastman (January 1, 1809 – March 21, 1881) was an American manufacturer and Democratic politician in the U.S. state of New Hampshire. He served as a member of the United States House of Representatives and as a member of the New Hampshire House of Representatives in the 1800s.

Early life 
Eastman was born in Gilmanton, New Hampshire, the son of Stephen and Hannah Eastman. He attended the local schools and Gilmanton Academy before graduating from Dartmouth College in Hanover, New Hampshire in 1829. He read law and was admitted to the bar in 1832. He began practicing law in Troy, New Hampshire.

Political career
Eastman returned to Gilmanton in 1834 and continued the practice of law. He served as clerk of the New Hampshire House of Representatives in 1835. He was as member of the State House of Representatives from 1836-1838, and served as speaker of the State House in 1837 and 1838. He was Register of Probate for Strafford County from 1836 to 1839.

Eastman was elected as a Democrat to the Twenty-sixth and Twenty-seventh Congresses, serving from March 4, 1839 - March 3, 1843. He served as chairman of the United States House Committee on Revisal and Unfinished Business during the Twenty-seventh Congress. He was not a candidate for renomination in 1842.

After leaving Congress, he served as judge of the New Hampshire Court of Common Pleas from 1844-1849. He served as associate justice of the New Hampshire Supreme Court from 1849-1855, and as justice of the New Hampshire Supreme Court from 1855-1859. In 1858, he was honored with a L.L.D. degree from Dartmouth College, and in 1859 he was chosen trustee of Dartmouth.

After resigning from judicial service, Eastman resumed the practice of law. He practiced law in Concord and Manchester. Eastman was an unsuccessful Democratic candidate for Governor of New Hampshire in 1863 and for United States Senator in 1866.

Eastman died on March 21, 1881 in Manchester and is interred in Valley Cemetery.

Personal life
Eastman was married to Jane Quackenbush and they had two children, Clarence and Anna Q. He was the nephew of Nehemiah Eastman, a United States Representative from New Hampshire.

References

External links
 	

	

1809 births
1881 deaths
Dartmouth College alumni
Democratic Party members of the United States House of Representatives from New Hampshire
Democratic Party members of the New Hampshire House of Representatives
19th-century American politicians
American lawyers admitted to the practice of law by reading law
Burials at Valley Cemetery
People from Gilmanton, New Hampshire